Leukocyte immunoglobulin-like receptor subfamily B member 3 is a protein that in humans is encoded by the LILRB3 gene.

This gene is a member of the leukocyte immunoglobulin-like receptor (LIR) family, which is found in a gene cluster at chromosomal region 19q13.4. The encoded protein belongs to the subfamily B class of LIR receptors which contain two or four extracellular immunoglobulin domains, a transmembrane domain, and two to four cytoplasmic immunoreceptor tyrosine-based inhibitory motifs (ITIMs). The receptor is expressed on immune cells and is believed to be a myeloid checkpoint. It is thought to control inflammatory responses and cytotoxicity to help focus the immune response and limit autoreactivity. Multiple transcript variants encoding different isoforms have been found for this gene.

See also
 Cluster of differentiation

References

Further reading

External links
 

Clusters of differentiation
Immunoglobulin superfamily